The S-Bahn Kärnten is a regional transport system in the  Austrian  state of Carinthia and East Tyrol. The system is run by the federal railways ÖBB.

Lines

S-Bahn line S1: Lienz ↔ Friesach 

Since 2008, S-Bahn Kärnten trains run every half hour between Villach and Klagenfurt as line S1. This line was extended to St. Veit an der Glan in December 2010.

On Saturdays, Sundays and public holidays, as well as major events, the  S1-Nightline  runs between Spittal-Millstättersee and St. Veit during the summer months until 3:00 in the morning every hour.

In the Western district of Klagenfurt since 2015 a new S-Bahn station for the S1 was built, called Klagenfurt West. It connects the eastern bay of the Wörthersee with the University of Klagenfurt, the Klagenfurt beach, the Europapark as well as the P & R facility at Minimundus. It also acts as a public transport hub (S-Bahn, Postbus, STW buses). The bus stop is currently the terminus of the city bus line 60, which runs via the University of Klagenfurt and the Heiligengeistplatz in the direction of Steingasse every half hour.

References 

Karnten
Transport in Carinthia (state)
Transport in Tyrol (state)